Holley Hollan (born November 8, 2001) is an American professional stock car racing driver. She last competed part-time in the ARCA Menards Series West and ARCA Menards Series East, driving the No. 50 Toyota Camry for Bill McAnally Racing.

Racing career

Early racing career 
At the age of 5, Hollan was inspired to go racing by watching other kids race at local tracks, and would start to race junior midget cars. When she turned 7, she would move up to micro sprints, winning several races. She would start traveling around the country to races as far as California and Wisconsin.

At the age of 12, she would move up to 600cc micros. During that year, she would also win the Port City Junior Sprints championship in 2014.

Midget car racing and Chili Bowl 

She would first race at the annual dirt midget event the Chili Bowl Nationals in 2018, being eliminated in the first I-main.

In 2019, she would race again in the Chili Bowl, being eliminated after finishing 13th in the second D-main. Later that year, she would tie the record for the best finish by a female driver in a national midget feature event in the POWRi Lucas Oil series with a second place finish.

In 2020, she would race for Keith Kunz Motorsports, being eliminated in second H-main.

In 2021, she would race once again for Keith Kunz Motorsports, being eliminated in the second E-main.

ARCA Menards Series West 
Hollan was announced on January 14, 2020, to drive the full 2020 ARCA Menards Series West season for Bill McAnally Racing, driving the No. 50, along with select other races in other series for the team. She would first race in the ARCA Menards Series East opener that year, finishing 15th. She would fare better in the first half of the season, with four top-10s in six starts. However, she would miss the final race of the season.

Personal life 
Holley's father, Harley, was the third-generation racer in her family, making Holley a fourth-generation racer. Harley won the 2018 and 2020 POWRi Micro championships.

Hollan, after her freshman year of high school, attended Depic Charter Schools, an online school. She would graduate a year early to focus on her racing career.

Motorsports career results

ARCA Menards Series East 
(key) (Bold – Pole position awarded by qualifying time. Italics – Pole position earned by points standings or practice time. * – Most laps led.)

ARCA Menards Series West

References

External links 

 

2001 births
Living people
ARCA Menards Series drivers
NASCAR drivers
Racing drivers from Oklahoma
Sportspeople from Oklahoma